"The Originist" is a short story by Orson Scott Card. First published in the short story collection Foundation's Friends (1989), it also appears in his short story collection Maps in a Mirror. This story is set in Isaac Asimov's Foundation universe.

Plot summary
The events in "The Originist" take place just after the first part of Foundation and deal with Hari Seldon's establishment of the Second Foundation.

Reception 
David Langford who commented briefly on the anthology Foundation's Friends, praised Orson Scott Card's work as the best story in the anthology and "the best Foundation/Empire story ever written". Similar sentiment was expressed by the reviewer for asimovreviews.net.

See also
List of works by Orson Scott Card

References

1989 short stories
Foundation universe
Science fiction short stories
Short stories by Orson Scott Card